The Last Supper is the 12th studio album by German heavy metal band Grave Digger.

Track listing
All songs composed and arranged by Boltendahl/Becker/Schmidt and Katzenburg; all lyrics by Boltendahl.

Artwork
After the cover art was revealed in November 2004, which received positive feedback, a number of fans were disappointed by it because of the motive. The band stated that the cover isn't a message of the Devil and not against Christians, but a representation of a depressive Jesus Christ at his last days before his death.

Inspiration

Despite claims to the contrary, the album is not a concept album, although several songs are based on the last days of Jesus Christ:
 "The Last Supper", about the last supper of Jesus Christ and the treachery of Judas
 "Soul Savior", about Christianity
 "Crucified", about the feeling of Jesus when he was crucified
 "Divided Cross", about the time when Jesus was crucified and the feelings of the people
 "Always and Eternally", about the memories and belief that remains after Christ died

Personnel
 Chris Boltendahl - vocals
 Manni Schmidt - guitars
 Jens Becker - bass
 Stefan Arnold - drums
 H.P. Katzenburg - keyboards

References

Grave Digger (band) albums
2005 albums
Nuclear Blast albums